Jonas Karl Rönnqvist (born 22 August 1973) is a Swedish former professional ice hockey player who played 38 games in the National Hockey League for the Mighty Ducks of Anaheim during the 2000–01 NHL season. The rest of his career, which lasted from 1991 to 2005, was mainly spent in Sweden, where he played for Luleå HF and Bodens IK. After retiring he became a coach, and was the head coach of Luleå from 2010 to 2014.

Playing career
Drafted 98th overall by the Ducks in the 2000 NHL Entry Draft from Swedish side Luleå HF, Rönnqvist played 38 regular season games during the 2000–01 NHL season, scoring four assists and collecting 14 penalty minutes. After spending the entirety of the 2001–02 season with the Ducks' AHL affiliate the Cincinnati Mighty Ducks, Rönnqvist returned to Luleå where he remained until his retirement in 2005, caused by an injury.

Coaching career
Rönnqvist coached Almtuna in the Swedish secondary league, almost clinching a surprising promotion to the Swedish Elite League in 2010. That earned Rönnqvist a contract to coach Luleå, his former club as a player.

Career statistics

Regular season and playoffs

International

External links

1973 births
Anaheim Ducks draft picks
Bodens IK players
Cincinnati Mighty Ducks players
Living people
Luleå HF players
Mighty Ducks of Anaheim players
People from Kalix Municipality
Swedish expatriate ice hockey players in the United States
Swedish ice hockey coaches
Swedish ice hockey left wingers
Sportspeople from Norrbotten County